Monroe County is located in the Arkansas Delta in the U.S. state of Arkansas. The county is named for James Monroe, the fifth President of the United States. Created as Arkansas's 20th county on November 2, 1829, Monroe County is home to two incorporated towns and three incorporated cities, including Clarendon, the county seat, and Brinkley, the most populous city. The county is also the site of numerous unincorporated communities and ghost towns.

Occupying only , Monroe County is the 22nd smallest county in Arkansas. As of the 2020 Census, the county's population was 6,799. Based on population, the county is the fifth-smallest county of the 75 in Arkansas. Located in the Arkansas Delta, the county is largely flat with fertile soils. Historically covered in forest, bayous, swamps, and grasslands, the area was cleared for agriculture by early European-American settlers who used enslaved African Americans to do the work and to cultivate cotton. It is drained by the Cache River, Bayou DeView, and the White River. Three large protected areas preserve old growth bald cypress forest, sloughs and wildlife habitat in the county: Cache River National Wildlife Refuge (NWR), Dagmar Wildlife Management Area and White River NWR and provide places for hunting and fishing.

Interstate 40 is the only Interstate highway in Monroe County, crossing the county from east to west through Brinkley, the largest city. The county also has three United States highways (U.S. Route 49 [US 49], US 70, and US 79) and twelve Arkansas state highways run in the county. A Union Pacific Railroad line crosses the county from southwest to northeast.

History

Shortly after the United States had completed the Louisiana Purchase, officials began to survey the territory at a site near the intersection of Monroe, Phillips, and Lee counties. The point was commemorated in 1961 by the Arkansas General Assembly as part of Louisiana Purchase State Park.

Settlement in Monroe County began when Dedrick Pike settled in 1816 where the Cache River enters the White River. The settlement was named Mouth of the Cache, and a post office by that name was opened years later. The community renamed itself Clarendon in 1824 in honor of the Earl of Clarendon. Monroe County was established under the Arkansas territorial legislature in 1829, and the county seat was established at Lawrenceville, where a jail and courthouse were erected. A ferry across the White River was founded in 1836.

In 1857 the county seat was moved to Clarendon, Arkansas. The new brick courthouse was nearly finished by the outbreak of the American Civil War in 1861. The county sent five units into Confederate service. After Union troops captured Clarendon in 1863, they destroyed the small city. The Union had completely dismantled the brick courthouse and shipped the bricks to De Valls Bluff. 
 
After the war, during Reconstruction, there was a high level of violence by insurgent whites seeking to suppress the rights of freedmen and to keep them from voting. After Republican Congressman James M. Hinds was murdered by the Ku Klux Klan in Monroe County in October, 1868, Governor Powell Clayton established martial law in ten counties, including Monroe County, as the attacks and murders were out of control. Four military districts were operated for four years in an effort to suppress guerrilla insurgency by white paramilitary groups, such as the Ku Klux Klan and others. They continued to challenge enfranchisement of blacks and the increasing power of Republicans in the county. The Monroe County Sun newspaper was established in 1876.

Violence continued after Reconstruction, when Democrats had regained control of the state legislature. Whites struggled to re-establish white supremacy, by violence and intimidation of black Republican voters. At the turn of the century, the state legislature passed measures that effectively disenfranchised most blacks for decades. The Equal Justice Initiative reported in 2015 that the county had 12 lynchings of African Americans from 1877 to 1950, most in the decades near the turn of the 20th century. This was the fourth-highest of any county in the state. To escape the violence, thousands of African Americans left the state in the Great Migration to northern and western cities, especially after 1940.

Mechanization of farming and industrial-scale agriculture have decreased the need for workers. The rural county has continued to lose population because of the lack of work opportunities. There has been a decrease in population every decade since 1940.

Geography

The county is located in the Arkansas Delta, one of the six primary geographic regions of Arkansas. The Arkansas Delta is a subregion of the Mississippi Alluvial Plain, which is a flat area consisting of rich, fertile sediment deposits from the Mississippi River between Louisiana and Illinois. Large portions of Monroe County are also within the Grand Prairie, a subdivision of the Arkansas Delta known today for rice farming and aquaculture.

Prior to settlement, Monroe County was densely forested, with bayous, sloughs, and swamps crossing the land. Seeking to take advantage of the area's fertile soils, settlers cleared the land to better suit row crops. Although some swampland has been preserved in the conservation areas like the Cache River NWR and White River NWR, and some former farmland has undergone reforestation, the majority (52 percent) of the county remains in cultivation. Another large land use in Monroe County is the Cache River NWR and White River NWR, owned by the United States Fish and Wildlife Service.

Monroe County is surrounded by six other Delta counties: Woodruff County to the north, St. Francis County to the northeast, Lee County and Phillips County to the east, Arkansas County to the southwest, and Prairie County to the west.

Hydrology
Water is an extremely important part of Monroe County's geography, history, economy, and culture. The many rivers, streams, ditches, sloughs and bayous crossing the county have featured prominently since prehistoric times. Native American tribes settled near them and peoples such as the Quapaw constructed burial mounds at Indian Bay in extreme southern Monroe County (today preserved as Baytown Site).

Europeans who settled in the county also used the White River to navigate through the area and trade.  Control of the White River lead to military action in the county during the Civil War, including a gunboat battle at Clarendon in 1864. The Flood of 1927 damaged much of the county's settlements along the White, and inundated Clarendon when the levees protecting the city failed on April 20. Conservation efforts by leaders in the county resulted in the creation of federal and state protected areas around the Cache and White rivers, to protect wetlands that could absorb flooding, beginning in 1935. These have been expanded to the current day, as engineers understand more about the positive role of wetlands in floodplain ecology.

The White River, one of Arkansas's most important rivers, is the county's major hydrologic features. The White forms the southwestern boundary of the county with Arkansas County. The Cache River runs on the west side of Monroe County, partially forming its border with Prairie County. Both the Cache River and Roc Roe Bayou empty into the White near Clarendon. Bayou De View runs through the north part of the county and meets the Cache north of Dobbs Landing.

National protected areas
 Cache River National Wildlife Refuge (part)
 White River National Wildlife Refuge (part)

Demographics

2020 census

As of the 2020 United States Census, there were 6,799 people, 3,333 households, and 1,974 families residing in the county.

2000 census
As of the 2000 United States Census, there were 10,254 people, 4,105 households, and 2,733 families residing in the county.  The population density was 17 people per square mile (7/km2).  There were 5,067 housing units at an average density of 8 per square mile (3/km2).  The racial makeup of the county was 59.37% White, 38.79% Black or African American, 0.26% Native American, 0.13% Asian, 0.04% Pacific Islander, 0.26% from other races, and 1.14% from two or more races.  1.29% of the population were Hispanic or Latino of any race.

There were 4,105 households, out of which 29.30% had children under the age of 18 living with them, 46.10% were married couples living together, 16.70% had a female householder with no husband present, and 33.40% were non-families. 30.10% of all households were made up of individuals, and 15.10% had someone living alone who was 65 years of age or older.  The average household size was 2.47 and the average family size was 3.07.

In the county, the population was spread out, with 27.90% under the age of 18, 7.60% from 18 to 24, 23.70% from 25 to 44, 23.40% from 45 to 64, and 17.30% who were 65 years of age or older.  The median age was 38 years. For every 100 females there were 88.50 males.  For every 100 females age 18 and over, there were 83.30 males.

The median income for a household in the county was $22,632, and the median income for a family was $28,915. Males had a median income of $25,299 versus $17,117 for females. The per capita income for the county was $13,096.  About 21.00% of families and 27.50% of the population were below the poverty line, including 37.40% of those under age 18 and 22.40% of those age 65 or over.

Government

The county government is a constitutional body granted specific powers by the Constitution of Arkansas and the Arkansas Code. The quorum court is the legislative branch of the county government and controls all spending and revenue collection. Representatives are called justices of the peace and are elected from county districts every even-numbered year. The number of districts in a county vary from nine to fifteen, and district boundaries are drawn by the county election commission. The Monroe County Quorum Court has nine members. Presiding over quorum court meetings is the county judge, who serves as the chief operating officer of the county. The county judge is elected at-large and does not vote in quorum court business, although capable of vetoing quorum court decisions.

Politics
A portion of Monroe County is represented in the Arkansas State Senate by the Republican Ronald R. Caldwell, a real estate businessman from Wynne in Cross County. The state representative from Monroe County is a Democrat, Marshall Wright, a lawyer from Forrest City in St. Francis County.

Prior to 2000, Monroe was considered an "ancestral" Democratic county, with exceptions for the 1972 and 1984 landslides of Richard Nixon and Ronald Reagan, respectively. Former Governor Bill Clinton won this county twice in his presidential runs: 1992 and 1996. John Kerry won the county in 2004, the most recent Democrat to do so.

Over the past few election cycles Monroe has trended a bit more to the Republican Party, albeit with less fervor than its neighboring counties. Barack Obama lost the county by only two votes in his 2012 run, and former Arkansas First Lady Hillary Clinton lost it by more than six points, 51%-45%, in her 2016 race.

Communities

Cities

Brinkley
Clarendon (county seat)
Holly Grove

Towns
Fargo
Roe

Census-designated places
Indian Bay
Monroe

Townships

 Brinkley (most of Brinkley)
 Brown
 Cache (Clarendon)
 Cleburne
 Cypress Ridge
 Dixon (part of Brinkley)
 Duncan (Holly Grove)
 Greenfield (Fargo)
 Hindman
 Jackson
 Keevil
 Montgomery-Smalley
 Pine Ridge
 Raymond
 Richland (part of Brinkley)
 Roc Roe (Roe)

Infrastructure

Aviation

Monroe County is home to three public own/public use general aviation (GA) airports. Each airport is used largely for agricultural spraying operations. The Clarendon Municipal Airport located southwest of Clarendon and northwest of Roe along Highway 33. For the twelve-month period ending August 31, 2015, the facility saw 26,000 general aviation operations. Frank Federer Memorial Airport in southeast Brinkley had 22,000 GA operations in the twelve-month period ending August 31, 2015. Holly Grove Municipal Airport located east of Holly Grove on Highway 146 is also a small rural airport. For the twelve-month period ending August 31, 2015, the facility saw 22,000 general aviation operations.

Major highways

 Interstate 40
 U.S. Highway 49
 U.S. Highway 70
 U.S. Highway 79
 Highway 1
 Highway 17
 Highway 33
 Highway 39
 Highway 86
 Highway 146
 Highway 238
 Highway 241
 Highway 302
 Highway 316
 Highway 362
 Highway 366

Utilities

The Arkansas Department of Health is responsible for the regulation and oversight of public water systems throughout the state. Monroe County contains six community water systems: Brinkley Waterworks, Clarendon Waterworks, Holly Grove Waterworks, Roe Waterworks, United Water Association and East Monroe County Water Users. Brinkley Waterworks has the largest retail population (4,281), followed by Clarendon (1,640), and Holly Grove (1,010). All community water systems in Monroe County use groundwater as their source of raw water, except East Monroe County Water Users, who purchases all water from Brinkley.

Notable person
 Sheffield Nelson, the Arkansas Republican National Committeeman and his party's gubernatorial nominee in 1990 and 1994, was born in 1940 in Monroe County.

See also
 List of lakes in Monroe County, Arkansas
 National Register of Historic Places listings in Monroe County, Arkansas

Notes and references

Notes

References

 
1829 establishments in Arkansas Territory
Populated places established in 1829